Mercer Township is located in Mercer County, Illinois. As of the 2010 census, its population was 4,071 and it contained 1,873 housing units. Mercer Township changed its name from Centre Township on an unknown date sometime before 1921. Mercer Township contains Aledo, the county seat of Mercer County.

Geography

Demographics

References

External links
City-data.com
Illinois State Archives

Townships in Mercer County, Illinois
Townships in Illinois